Julie Hall may refer to:

 Julie Hall (golfer) (born 1967), English golfer
 Julie Hall (public health), public health specialist